Minervino di Lecce is a town and comune in the  province of Lecce, Apulia, south-eastern Italy.

Main sights
Mother church (mid-16th century), one of the most refined Renaissance churches in the Salento. It has carved portals,  a richly decorated and wide rose window, large bronze bell and a decorated apse in local stone. One of the portal has a large statue of St. Michael Archangel.
Church of Madonna delle Grazie
Convent of St. Anthony (1624)

The Dolmen Li Scusi, in the town's countryside towards Uggiano La Chiesa, is the largest dolmen in Apulia after that of Bisceglie. The frazione of Cocumola is home to numerous Messapic granarys (locally known as fogge) and several menhirs.

Mga sanggunian 

Cities and towns in Apulia
Localities of Salento